The East Carolina–NC State rivalry is a rivalry between East Carolina University and North Carolina State University. Both teams are located in North Carolina. The intensity of the rivalry is driven by the proximity (both are UNC system schools and are only 83 miles apart via U.S. Highway 264) and the size of the two schools (NC State is the largest university in the state and East Carolina is the fourth largest).

East Carolina was founded in 1907 as a normal school. It became a four-year institution in 1920 and was renamed East Carolina Teachers College. It then became East Carolina College in 1951 and East Carolina University in 1967. East Carolina joined the UNC System in 1972.

North Carolina State was founded in 1887 as a land-grant college. Its original name was North Carolina College of Agriculture and Mechanic Arts. In 1918, it changed its name to North Carolina State College of Agriculture and Engineering. In 1931, the school moved to under the Consolidated University of North Carolina and was renamed North Carolina State College of Agriculture and Engineering of the University of North Carolina. It once again was renamed North Carolina State of the University of North Carolina at Raleigh in 1963 and received its current name in 1965.

Football

The most prominent sport in the rivalry is football. The two teams began competing against each other in 1970. The football series between the two teams was suspended in 1987. Jim Valvano terminated NC State’s scheduling of East Carolina after Pirate fans tore down goal posts and the playing surface at Carter–Finley in 1987. NC State’s athletics administration had publicly warned ECU and Pirate fans after two consecutive years of minor vandalisms to the stadium. 
The schools would not meet again until the 1992 Peach Bowl. In 1996, the two schools met in Charlotte's Bank of America Stadium rather than on either school's home field. In 1997, the North Carolina Legislature proposed a bill demanding that UNC–CH and N.C. State must play East Carolina on an annual basis. This would officially revive the series between East Carolina and N.C. State.

East Carolina and NC State have met on the football field 32 times, with 24 of those games played in Carter–Finley Stadium, 5 in Dowdy–Ficklen Stadium, and 3 in neutral venues. The highest profile game was played in the 1992 Peach Bowl, with 59,322 fans in attendance, this game would officially go on record as the largest attendance at the time for a game between two North Carolina college football teams.

NC State leads the all-time series, with 19 wins to East Carolina's 13 wins.

Victory Barrel
In 2007, the Student Government Associations of both North Carolina State University and East Carolina University in a cooperative agreement began awarding the ‘Victory Barrel’ to the game winner. The outer face of the barrel is affixed with engraved colored plates denoting the year, final score, and winner of each contest dating back to 1970.

Football game results

Men's basketball

NC State currently leads the series 20–1. NC State won the most recent matchup between the two teams 90–79 on December 21, 2013 at PNC Arena. There are currently no scheduled games between the two teams.

Basketball game results

Baseball

Baseball is the second most prominent sport in the rivalry, with the two teams having played 111 times. NC State leads the series 70–41. The two teams played twice during the 2022 season in Greenville and Raleigh, with NC State sweeping the season series. NC State went to Greenville and shut out ECU, 2–0, on March 29, 2022. On April 26, 2022, NC State finished off the 2nd meeting by beating ECU in Raleigh, 12–3.

See also  
 List of NCAA college football rivalry games

References

College football rivalries in the United States
East Carolina Pirates football
NC State Wolfpack football
1966 establishments in North Carolina